Victor Oatis (born January 6, 1959) is a former American football wide receiver. He played for the Baltimore Colts in 1983.

References

1959 births
Living people
American football wide receivers
Northwestern State Demons football players
Baltimore Colts players